Headbanger is a slang term for a fan of heavy metal music.

Headbanger or Headbangers may also refer to:

Music
"Headbanger" (Babymetal song), a 2012 Japanese language song by Babymetal
"Head Banger" (EPMD song), a 1993 song by EPMD
"Headbanger", a 1992 song and single by Gobblehoof
"Headbanger", a 1996 song by Pansy Division
"Headbanger", a 2002 composition by Matthew Hindson

Other uses
The Headbangers, a professional wrestling tag team consisting of Mosh (Chaz) and Thrasher Glen Ruth
Headbanger, a 1996 crime novel by Hugo Hamilton (writer)

Head Banger, the dwarfish name of Ankh-Morpork City Watch's captain Carrot Ironfoundersson in Terry Pratchett's Discworld